A bolster is a type of pillow or cushion.

Bolster may also refer to:
 Bolster (knife), the thick metal portion of a knife joining the handle and the blade
 Bolster (surname)
 Bolster, Washington, a ghost town in Okanogan County, Washington
 Bolster the Giant, a giant in Cornish legend
 Bolster plate, part of a stamping press
 Span bolster, railroad terminology
 Truck bolster, railroad terminology
 USS Bolster (ARS-38), a Diver-class rescue and salvage ship
 A type of Chisel

See also
 Bolster heath